Kučine may refer to:

 Kučine, Bosnia and Herzegovina, a village near Goražde
 Kučine, Croatia, a village near Solin, Croatia